One Shot is the ninth book in the Jack Reacher series written by Lee Child. The book title is based on
"One shot, one kill," the military sniper's creed. The novel was adapted into the 2012 film Jack Reacher, starring Tom Cruise as the title character. This book is written in the third person.

Plot
In a small Indiana city, a lone gunman in a parking garage calmly fires into a rush-hour crowd in a public plaza, committing a massacre of five apparently random victims with six shots. The shooter leaves a perfect trail behind for the police to quickly track him down. Evidence from the scene, of a shell case and a quarter bearing the same fingerprints, points clearly to James Barr, a former Army infantry sniper. He is arrested, but will only say two things to the police: "They got the wrong guy," and "Get Jack Reacher for me." Reacher has no job, no home, no car, and a shrinking savings account from his past military pay. Although Reacher has a nomadic existence, what he does have is sharp moral clarity.

Instead of clearing Barr, Reacher wants to assist the prosecution in convicting him. Reacher is the last person Barr would want to see for good reason. When Reacher was an investigating military policeman years past, Barr had gone on a killing spree similar to the Indiana shootout, murdering four men during the Gulf War in Kuwait City. Convoluted military politics and a technicality let Barr walk free. Reacher swore he would track the sniper down if he ever tried it again. Reacher believes Barr is guilty, but Barr's sister Rosemary is convinced of her brother's innocence and entreats lawyer Helen Rodin to defend her brother. Helen's father is the district attorney who will prosecute the case. When Reacher arrives in Indiana, Barr has been beaten so badly while in prison that he cannot remember anything about the day of the murders, leaving Reacher to form his own conclusions with the available evidence. The local NBC news reporter, Ann Yanni, is also looking for more information, and Reacher is more than willing to include her in his investigation, in exchange for the use of her car and a guaranteed public exposé on the Barr case. Reacher knows that 35 yards, the parking garage shooting distance to the victims, is point-blank range for a trained military sniper like Barr. Reacher also knows the shooter missed one shot on purpose, giving Reacher one shot at the truth.

Reacher drives to Kentucky to the shooting range where the sniper practiced and learns some interesting facts from Gunny Samuel Cash, the former US Marine who owns the shooting range, which make him doubt the solidity of the presumably airtight case against Barr. Cash is unwilling to reveal information or his records to Reacher, but grudgingly agrees to talk if Reacher is able to hit a paper target dead center at 300 yards with one shot. After he succeeds, Reacher is shown 32 sheets of target paper from three years' worth of Barr's practice shootings at his range, every single sheet with dead-on maximum scores.  Reacher, given his expertise with firearms and experience as a military investigator, quickly deduces that the target sheets were faked by using a handgun at point blank range.

After the visit to the shooting range, Reacher adds Cash's information to the case evidence. Helen and Rosemary sift through the clues in a riveting analysis and finally get Reacher to conclude that Barr is innocent, which means someone set up Barr as the sniper. Someone is also trying to get Reacher off the case, which formerly seemed a slam-dunk, but is now falling apart. Reacher is teamed with Helen, working against a prosecution team that has an explosive secret of its own. Reacher gets closer to the unseen enemy pulling the strings, leading him to the real perpetrators, a Russian gang masquerading as legitimate businessmen. The gang's 80-year-old capo spent much of his life in one of the infamous Soviet gulags and is known only as the Zec (prisoner). Reacher outwits the mob guards in the Russian gang's fortress, efficiently and brutally dispatching five hoods before confronting the boss and forcing him to come clean on the conspiracy from beginning to end: covering up the murder of the one victim he wants dead with the other four victims. The real killer is shot, the Zec chooses to confess to the authorities who arrive on the scene, Barr goes free, and Reacher moves on.

Awards and nominations
2006 Macavity Award nominee, Best Mystery Novel
New York Times Bestseller

Film adaptation

The novel was adapted into the 2012 film Jack Reacher. Written and directed by Christopher McQuarrie, the film stars Tom Cruise as the title character. The film entered production in October 2011, and concluded in January 2012. The setting, however, was changed from Indiana to Pittsburgh, Pennsylvania, where the film was shot in its entirety. Lee Child has a cameo role as the property desk officer in the police station after Reacher's arrest. The film was released on 21 December 2012. A premiere at Pittsburgh's Southside Works megaplex on 15 December, to have been attended by the film's stars and Child, was postponed following the Sandy Hook Elementary School shooting.

See also
List of books, articles and documentaries about snipers

References

External links
One Shot official website.

2005 British novels
British thriller novels
British novels adapted into films
Jack Reacher books
English-language novels
Books about snipers
Novels set in Indiana
Third-person narrative novels
Bantam Press books
Delacorte Press books